Freneau is an unincorporated community located within Matawan in Monmouth County, New Jersey, United States. It is named for Philip Freneau (1752–1832), a poet during the American Revolutionary War. The community is located along New Jersey Route 79 in the southern portion of Matawan and was formerly served by the Monmouth County Agricultural Railroad (now a part of the Henry Hudson Trail).

References

Matawan, New Jersey
Unincorporated communities in Monmouth County, New Jersey
Unincorporated communities in New Jersey